Loreto College is a Catholic women's college in Kolkata, India. Affiliated with the University of Calcutta, the college focuses on liberal arts and sciences. It was established in 1912 by the Religious Order of the Institute of the Blessed Virgin Mary. , the college is 'A' rated by the National Assessment and Accreditation Council (NAAC).

Academics at Loreto College 
Loreto College offers B.A.(Honors), B.A. (General), B.Sc (General) and B.Sc (Honors) courses. The courses offered by the college in respective areas are as follows:

1) B.A. (Honors):

a) English

b) Education

c) History

d) Political Science

e) Psychology

2) B.A. (General):

The college offers the degree with any three electives one of the following combinations:

a) History/ Political Science/ Education

b) History/ Education/ English / Hindi / Bengali

c) Geography/ Political Science English / Hindi / Bengali

d) Economics/ History/ Education / Political Science

3) B.Sc (General):

A student pursuing the degree from Loreto College requires doing so with the three electives given below:

a) Geography

b) Economics

c) Political Science

4) B.Sc (Honors):

a) Geography

b) Psychology

c) Economics

The college also offers a B.Ed course and M.A. in English. 

The college offers a variety of electives to the students, which they have to choose and study as per the CBCS system. The college also encourages the students to take up enrichment courses which help them in future endeavors. The students also have to compulsorily, irrespective of departments/courses, take up a three-years course on computer science under the college. 

There're a wide range of societies in the college, which the students are encouraged to take up (besides the compulsory societies). The societies regularly organise discussions, debates and competitions and help the students get exposed to a vivid environment of co-curricular activities.

Notable alumni
 Bharati Mukherjee, American author
 Moon Moon Sen, Bollywood actress
 Ruchira Gupta, social activist
 Shaista Suhrawardy Ikramullah, Pakistani politician, diplomat and author
 Zaib-un-Nissa Hamidullah, Pakistani journalist, editor, and feminist
 Anashua Majumdar, Bengali actress
 Jaya Bachchan, Indian actress and Politician
 Anamika Khanna, Indian fashion designer 
 Asma Khan, British chef 
 Bachi karkaria, Indian journalist and Columnist 
 Kamalinee Mukherjee, Indian actress 
 Indu Puri, Sportsperson
 Leila Seth, Indian judge
 Pinky Lilani, Author and Women's advocate 
 Rajashree Birla, Indian philanthropist 
 Rukmini Maitra, Indian model and Actress 
 Sudeshna Roy, Indian film director 
 Ruchira Gupta, Indian journalist and Activist 
 Debolina Dutta, Indian actress

See also 
List of colleges affiliated to the University of Calcutta
Education in India
Education in West Bengal

References

External links
 Official website

Educational institutions established in 1912
Catholic universities and colleges in India
Schools in Colonial India
Universities and colleges in Kolkata
Women's universities and colleges in West Bengal
University of Calcutta affiliates
1912 establishments in India